Franklin Corwin (January 12, 1818 – June 15, 1879) was a United States representative from Illinois.

Born in Lebanon, Ohio, he attended private schools, studied law, and was admitted to the bar in 1839, practicing in Wilmington, Ohio. He served in both houses of the Ohio General Assembly. He moved to Peru, Illinois in 1857, and later became a member of the Illinois House of Representatives, serving as speaker.

He was elected as a Republican to the Forty-third Congress, serving from March 4, 1873, to March 3, 1875.

He ran unsuccessfully for reelection in 1874, and resumed the practice of law in Peru. He died there in June 1879, aged 61.

Corwin was the nephew of U.S. Representatives Moses Bledso Corwin and Thomas Corwin.

External links

1818 births
1879 deaths
Ohio lawyers
People from Peru, Illinois
Republican Party Ohio state senators
Republican Party members of the Ohio House of Representatives
Speakers of the Illinois House of Representatives
Republican Party members of the Illinois House of Representatives
People from Lebanon, Ohio
Illinois lawyers
Republican Party members of the United States House of Representatives from Illinois
19th-century American politicians
19th-century American lawyers